Hvozdnica is a village and municipality in Bytča District in the Žilina Region of northern Slovakia.

History
In historical records the village was first mentioned in 1250.

Geography
The municipality lies at an altitude of 327 metres and covers an area of 8,73 km². It has a population of about 1181 people.

Genealogical resources

The records for genealogical research are available at the state archive "Statny Archiv in Bytca, Slovakia"

 Roman Catholic church records (births/marriages/deaths): 1683-1949 (parish B)

See also
 List of municipalities and towns in Slovakia

External links
http://www.hvozdnica.sk
Surnames of living people in Hvozdnica

Villages and municipalities in Bytča District